"Journey Through the Decade" (stylized "Journey through the Decade") is a song by Japanese pop singer Gackt, serving as his thirtieth single released on March 25, 2009. It is his first song performed for Kamen Rider Decade, used as the television series' theme song.

Summary
It was used as the opening theme song for the 2009 Kamen Rider Series Kamen Rider Decade. It was released as a single CD and as a CD coupled with a DVD with the music video.

CD

DVD
The music video of "Journey Through the Decade" was later released in Stay the Ride Alive, "special memorial single" version which is a Digipak with a special cover, a third disc and a booklet describing Gackt's collaboration with the Kamen Rider Decade production.

Charts 
On its first day of release, it sold 15,000 copies and reached #2 on the Oricon Daily Charts. By the release of its follow up single "The Next Decade", "Journey Through the Decade" had sold 94,000 copies. It stayed 25 weeks on the music charts. In June 2009, the Recording Industry Association of Japan certified it as gold. In December 2012, it was certified as platinum for sales of over 200,000 copies.

Oricon

Billboard Japan

References

External links
Kamen Rider Decade  on Avex Mode's official website

2009 singles
Gackt songs
Japanese-language songs
Japanese television drama theme songs
Songs with lyrics by Shoko Fujibayashi
Kamen Rider